Jack Ratcliffe (10 March 1880–1948) was an English footballer who played in the Football League for Derby County and Middlesbrough.

References

1880 births
1948 deaths
English footballers
Association football defenders
English Football League players
Loughborough Corinthians F.C. players
Derby County F.C. players
Middlesbrough F.C. players